Thomas Ansell Marshall (18 March 1827 – 11 April 1903) was an English cleric and entomologist, mainly interested in Hymenoptera. He was the son of Thomas Marshall, one of the original members of the Royal Entomological Society of London.

Works
1870 Ichneumonidium Brittanicorum Catalogus. London
1872 A catalogue of  British  Hymenoptera; Chrysididae, Ichneumonidae, Braconidae and Evaniidae. London.
1873 A catalogue of British Hymenoptera; Oxyura. Entomological Society of London, London.. 
1874. Hymenoptera. New British species, corrections of nomenclature, etc. (Cynipidae, Ichneumonidae, Braconidae, and Oxyura). Entomologists Annual  1874: 114-146. 
1904 with  Jean Jacques Kieffer  Proctotrupidae. Species des Hymenopteres d'Europe et d'Algerie. Vol. 9. 
Together with very numerous short papers, mainly in the Entomologist's Monthly Magazine, and one on Hymenoptera from Venezuela  in the Bulletin Societe Entomologique de France. Two of the papers are on Hymenoptera from Lapland and Spitzbergen.

Collections
Braconidae, Chalcididae, Proctotrupidae, Ichneumonidae und Tenthredinidae are in the Natural History Museum, London and the Hungarian Natural History Museum in Budapest. There are, in addition some British Diptera in the University of Nottingham.

References

1827 births
1903 deaths
English entomologists
Hymenopterists
19th-century English clergy